Movieline was a website, formerly a Los Angeles-based film and entertainment magazine, launched in 1985 as a local magazine, which went national in 1989. Known for its cult status and popularity among film critics, the magazine eventually was retooled and named Movieline's Hollywood Life. The magazine closed in 2009.

PMC bought Movieline in September 2008. Hollywood Life'''s website survived the closing of the magazine, and Movieline'' was relaunched as a website. Movieline's last new post was in 2014.

Notable past writers include humorist Joe Queenan, film critic Stephen Farber, Martha Frankel and Stephen Rebello.

References

External links

1985 establishments in California
2009 disestablishments in California
Film magazines published in the United States
Defunct magazines published in the United States
Entertainment magazines published in the United States
Magazines established in 1985
Magazines disestablished in 2009
Magazines published in Los Angeles
Monthly magazines published in the United States
Online magazines published in the United States
Online magazines with defunct print editions
2014 disestablishments in the United States
Film websites